The Stanford prison experiment (SPE) was a psychological experiment conducted in the summer of 1971. It was a two-week simulation of a prison environment that examined the effects of situational variables on participants' reactions and behaviors. Stanford University psychology professor Philip Zimbardo led the research team who administered the study.

Participants were recruited from the local community with an ad in the newspapers offering $15 per day to male students who wanted to participate in a "psychological study of prison life." Volunteers were chosen after assessments of psychological stability, and then randomly assigned to being prisoners or prison guards. Critics have questioned the validity of these methods.

Those volunteers selected to be "guards" were given uniforms specifically to de-individuate them, and instructed to prevent prisoners from escaping. The experiment officially started when "prisoners" were arrested by real Palo Alto police. Over the following five days, psychological abuse of the prisoners by the "guards" became increasingly brutal. After psychologist Christina Maslach visited to evaluate the conditions, she was upset to see how study participants were behaving and she confronted Zimbardo. He ended the experiment on the sixth day.

SPE has been referenced and critiqued as one of the most unethical psychology experiments in history. The harm inflicted on the participants prompted universities worldwide to improve their ethics requirements for human subjects of experiments to prevent them from being similarly harmed. Other researchers have found it difficult to reproduce the study, especially given those constraints. Critics have described the study as unscientific and fraudulent.

Funding and methodology
The official website of the SPE describes the experiment goal as follows:

A 1996 article from the Stanford News Service described the experiment goal in a more detailed way:

The study was funded by the US Office of Naval Research to understand anti-social behaviour. The United States Navy and the United States Marine Corps wanted to investigate conflict between military guards and prisoners.

Criticism of the SPE has continued long after the experiment ended. Many researchers have critiqued Philip Zimbardo's Stanford Prison Experiment for its methodology, whether it meets the criteria to be a scientific experiment, and whether the guard orientation created a demand bias.

Publishing 
Prior to publishing in American Psychologist and other peer-reviewed journals, the researchers reported the findings in Naval Research Reviews, International Journal of Criminology and Penalogy (IJCP), and the New York Times Magazine. David Amodio, psychology instructor at both New York University and the University of Amsterdam, dismissed Zimbardo's study, stating that releasing the article to an "obscure journal" demonstrated that Zimbardo was unable to convince fellow psychologists of the validity and reliability of his study. This action taken by Zimbardo broke the tradition of scientific dissemination by publishing in other journals before publishing in a scientific peer-reviewed journal.

Zimbardo has stated that the grant agreement with the Office of Naval Research included a requirement to publish data in their journal, Naval Research Reviews. He states that the International Journal of Criminology and Penalogy invited Zimbardo to write about his study in their journal, and he then wrote an article with the New York Times Magazine to share the findings with a broad audience. He states that the article still needed to pass through the very strict requirements of the American Psychologist, the official journal of the American Psychological Association, in order to be published. After publishing the article in the American Psychologist, the findings were also reported in other peer-reviewed journals and books.

Preparation

Recruitment and selection

After receiving approval from the university to conduct the experiment, study participants were recruited using an ad in the "help wanted" section of the Palo Alto Times and The Stanford Daily newspapers in August 1972:

Seventy-five men applied, and after screening assessments and interviews, 26 were selected to participate in a two-week prison simulation. The applicants were predominantly white, middle-class, and appeared to be psychologically stable and healthy. The group of subjects was intentionally selected to exclude those with criminal backgrounds, psychological impairments, or medical problems.

Critics of the study have argued that selection bias may have played a role in the results due to the ad describing a need for prisoners and guards rather than a social psychology study. In 2008, Thomas Carnahan and Sam McFarland argued that those who applied to participate in the SPE already had traits associated with abusiveness. Aggression, right-wing authoritarianism, Machiavellianism, social dominance orientation, and narcissism would be high in those who volunteered for a prison experiment. Further, low dispositional empathy and altruism would also be indicators of someone who would volunteer.

On a random basis, half of the subjects were assigned the role of guard (nine plus three potential substitutes), and half were assigned to the role of prisoner (also nine plus three potential substitutes). They agreed to participate for a 7- to 14-day period for $15 per day (roughly equivalent to $108 ).

Prison environment 
The day before the experiment began, small mock prison cells were set up to hold three prisoners each. There was a small corridor for the prison yard, a closet for solitary confinement, and a bigger room across from the prisoners for the guards and warden.

The experiment was conducted in a  section of the basement of Jordan Hall, Stanford's psychology building. The prison had two fabricated walls: one at the entrance, and one at the cell wall to block observation. Each cell was unlit, was intended to house 3 prisoners and had a cot (with mattress, sheet, and pillow) for each prisoner. Prisoners were confined and were to stay in their cells and the yard all day and night until the end of the study. In contrast, the guards were to stay in a different environment, separate from the prisoners. The guards were given access to special areas for rest and relaxation. The guards were told to work in teams of three for eight-hour shifts. The guards were not required to stay on-site after their shift.

Roles 
Zimbardo took on the role of the Superintendent and an undergraduate research assistant, David Jaffe, took on the role of the Warden.

Digitized recordings available on the official SPE website were widely discussed in 2017, particularly one where warden David Jaffe tried to influence the behavior of one of the guards by encouraging him to participate more and be more "tough" for the benefit of the experiment.

Orientation 
The researchers held an orientation session for the guards the day before the experiment began, during which "guards" were instructed not to harm the prisoners physically or withhold food or drink, but to maintain law and order. The researchers provided the guards with wooden batons to establish their status, deindividuating clothing similar to that of an actual prison guard (khaki shirt and pants from a local military surplus store), and mirrored sunglasses to prevent eye contact and create anonymity.

Based on recordings from the experiment, guards were instructed by the researchers to disrespect the prisoners and make them feel submissive, helpless and unheard.  For example, they had to refer to prisoners by number rather than by name. This, according to Zimbardo, was intended to diminish the prisoners' individuality. With no control, prisoners learned they had little effect on what happened to them, ultimately causing them to stop responding and give up.

Zimbardo has explained that guard orientations in the prison system instructed the guards to exert power over the prisoners. Further, Zimbardo asserts that his fellow researcher explicitly instructed the guards to not physically inflict harm on the prisoners, but at the same time make the prisoners feel that they were in an actual prison.

Demand characteristics 
The study was criticized in 2012 for demand characteristics by psychologist Peter Gray, who argued that participants in psychological experiments are more likely to do what they believe the researchers want them to do, and specifically in the case of the SPE, "to act out their stereotyped views of what prisoners and guards do."

In 1975, Ali Banuazizi and Siamak Movahedi argued that the behavior of the participants in the SPE was a result of demand characteristics and not the prison environment, that there is no single definition of prisoner behavior, and that participants were simply acting in the role in which they had been cast.

In 2013, Peter Gray, researcher, textbook writer and editor, stipulated demand characteristics (participants guessing which behavior researchers want) influenced the SPE significantly. Guards' behaviors were implicitly condoned as neither Zimbardo nor his research assistants intervened. They argue that Zimbardo did not, "like to party", and conduct this experiment to explore how situations influence behaviors, but rather, he wanted to demonstrate that prison guards are already abusive, and prisoners are already submissive.

In 2018, Thibault Le Texier, a French researcher, in his book,  ('The History of a Lie'), questions the scientific validity and merit of the SPE. He further discussed his critiques in an article published by the APA in 2019. Le Texier asserts his arguments using testimonies of those participants who were assigned as guards. In Le Texier's opinion, the sadism and submission displayed in the SPE was directly caused by Zimbardo's instructions to the guards and the guards' desire to please the researchers.

In 2020, Dutch historian Rutger Bregman claimed the experiment to be dubious. He states that the guards were urged to act aggressively towards the prisoners. In his book Humankind: A Hopeful History, he is of the opinion that in similar experiments researchers set up the experiments to create hostility between groups and then interpret the finding to suit their needs.

David Eshelman, aka John Wayne, acknowledges that his theater background lent itself well to his role as guard, that he purposely thought of new ways to demean the prisoners – on one shift, Eshelman instructed the prisoners to simulate sodomy. Zimbardo has responded to this argument by stating that other guards acted similarly or engaged with Eshelman in the treatment of prisoners. While it is possible that one guard adopted his behavior from a movie (Eshelman identified with the warden in Cool Hand Luke), others did not. And, more importantly, guards on a different shift than Eshelman, exacted similar acts of emotional and mental brutality. Zimbardo further argues that the behaviors of the participant guards were not unlike those of real-world prison atrocities or the actions taken by American soldiers in the Abu Ghraib prison. Most of the guards have stated since the SPE that they were intentionally acting.

The  has pointed to the importance of leadership, of the form displayed by Zimbardo when briefing guards in the Stanford experiment, in the emergence of tyranny.

Carlo Prescott as a prison consultant 

In 2005, an article was published by Carlo Prescott in The Stanford Daily, explaining that the antagonistic tactics used by the guards were ones that he experienced during his time spent in San Quentin. He shared each one in detail with the researchers prior to the experiment. In Prescott's opinion, the participants in the experiment, having no experience as a prison guard, could not have acted in the ways they did unless they had been told of the explicit details of the actions they took.

Zimbardo has stated that he believed that the article was not written by Prescott, but rather by the screenwriter and producer, Michael Lazarou, who had unsuccessfully attempted to get the film rights to the story of the SPE. In Zimbardo's opinion, Prescott would not have written in such a legalistic way, and Zimbardo claims that, in phone records and emails obtained by Brett Emory, the SPE movie's producer asserted Prescott was not the author.

Events

Saturday, August 14: Set up 
The small mock prison cells were set up, and the participants who had been assigned a guard role attended an orientation where they were briefed and given uniforms.

Sunday, August 15: Day 1

The participants who had been assigned a prisoner role were mock-arrested by the local Palo Alto police at their homes or assigned sites. The participants were intentionally not informed that they would be arrested, as the researchers wanted it to come as a surprise. This was a breach of the ethics of Zimbardo’s own contract that all of the participants had signed. The arrest involved charging them with armed robbery, and burglary, Penal Codes 211 and 459 respectively. The Palo Alto police department assisted Zimbardo's team with the simulated arrests and conducted full booking procedures on the prisoners at the Palo Alto City police headquarters, which included warning of Miranda rights, fingerprinting and taking mug shots. All of these actions were video-documented by a local San Francisco TV station reporter travelling around in Zimbardo's car. Meanwhile, three guards prepped for the arrival of the inmates. The prisoners were then transported to the mock prison from the police station, sirens wailing. In the Stanford County Jail they were systematically strip searched, given their new identities (Inmate identification number), and uniform.

Prisoners wore uncomfortable, ill-fitting smocks without any underwear and stocking caps, as well as a chain around one ankle. Guards were instructed to call prisoners by their assigned numbers, sewn on their uniforms, instead of by name, thereby dehumanizing prisoners. The prisoners were then greeted by the warden, who conveyed the seriousness of their offence and their new status as prisoners. With the rules of the prison presented to them, the inmates retired to their cells for the rest of the first day of the experiment.

Monday, August 16: Day 2
Guards referred to prisoners by their identification and confined them to their small cells. At 2:30 am the prisoners rebelled against guards' wake up calls of whistles and clanging of batons. Prisoners refused to leave their cells to eat in the yard, ripped off their inmate number tags, took off their stocking caps and insulted the guards.

In response, guards sprayed fire extinguishers at the prisoners to reassert control. The three back-up guards were called in to help regain control of the prison. Guards removed all of the prisoners' clothes, removed mattresses and sentenced the main instigators to time in The Hole. They attempted to dissuade any further rebellion using psychological warfare. One of the guards said to the other that, "these are dangerous prisoners."

Tuesday, August 17: Day 3 
In order to restrict further acts of disobedience, the guards separated and rewarded prisoners who had minor roles in the rebellion. The three spent time in the "good" cell where they received clothing, beds, and food denied to the rest of the jail population. After an estimated 12 hours, the three returned to their old cells that lacked beds.

Guards were allowed to abuse their power to humiliate the inmates. They had the prisoners count off and do pushups arbitrarily, restricted access to the bathrooms, and forced them to relieve themselves in a bucket in their cells.

Prisoner 8612 
The first prisoner to leave the experiment was Douglas Korpi, prisoner 8612. After 36 hours, he had an apparent mental breakdown in which he yelled, "Jesus Christ, I'm burning up inside" and "I can't stand another night! I just can't take it anymore!" Upon seeing his suffering, research assistant Craig Haney released Korpi.

However, in a 2017 interview, Korpi stated that his breakdown had been fake, and that he did it only so that he could leave and return to studying for his Graduate Record Exam; he had originally thought that he could study while "imprisoned", but the "prison staff" would not allow him. Further, Korpi expressed regret that he had not filed a false imprisonment charge at the time.

Zimbardo responded to this criticism in 2018. First, while this experiment has been criticized overall for its ethics, Zimbardo stated that he needed to treat the breakdown as real and release the prisoner. Further, Zimbardo believes Korpi's 2017 interview was a lie: in 1992, in a documentary film about the study, Quiet Rage, Korpi asserted that the prison experiment had deeply affected him, and that experience led Korpi to later become a prison psychologist.

Wednesday, August 18: Day 4
Witnessing that guards divide prisoners based on their good or rebellious behavior, the inmates started to distance themselves from one another. Rioters believed that other prisoners were snitches and vice versa. Other prisoners saw the rebels as a threat to the status quo since they wanted to have their sleeping cots and clothes again.

"Prisoner 819" began showing symptoms of distress: he began crying in his cell. A priest was brought in to speak with him, but the young man declined to talk and instead asked for a medical doctor. After hearing him cry, Zimbardo reassured him of his actual identity and removed the prisoner. When "Prisoner 819" was leaving, the guards cajoled the remaining inmates to loudly and repeatedly decry that "819 is a bad prisoner."

Thursday, August 19: Day 5
The day was scheduled for visitations by friends and family of the inmates in order to simulate the prison experience.

Zimbardo and the guards made visitors wait for long periods of time to see their loved ones. Only two visitors could see any one prisoner and only for just ten minutes while a guard watched. Parents grew concerned about their sons' wellbeing and whether they had enough to eat. Some parents left with plans to contact lawyers to gain early release of their children.

On the same day, Zimbardo's colleague Gordon H. Bower arrived to check on the experiment and questioned Zimbardo about what the independent variable of the research was. Christina Maslach also visited the prison that night and was distressed after observing the guards abusing the prisoners, forcing them to wear bags over their heads. She challenged Zimbardo about his lack of caring oversight, and the immorality of the study. Finally, she made evident that Zimbardo had been changed by his role as Superintendent into someone she did not recognize and did not like. Her direct challenges prompted Zimbardo to end the SPE the next day.

Friday, August 20: Day 6 

Due to Maslach's objections, the parents' concerns, and the increasing brutality exhibited by guards in the experiment, Zimbardo ended the study on day 6. Zimbardo gathered the participants (guards, prisoners, and researchers) to let them know that the experiment was over, and arranged to pay them the full fee for 14 days, $210 (equivalent to $1490 in 2022). Zimbardo then met for several hours of informed debriefing first with all of the prisoners, then the guards, and finally everyone came together to share their experiences. Next, all participants were asked to complete a personal retrospective to be mailed to him subsequently. Finally, all participants were invited to return a week later to share their opinions and emotions.

Later, the physical components of the Stanford County Jail were taken down and out of the basement of Jordan Hall as the cells returned to their usual function as grad student offices. Zimbardo and his graduate student research team, Craig Haney and Curtis Banks, began compiling the multiple sources of data that would be the basis for several articles they soon wrote about their experiment, and for Zimbardo's later expanded and detailed review of the SPE in The Lucifer Effect (2007).

Interpretation and reproducibility of results 

According to Zimbardo's interpretation of the SPE, it demonstrated that the simulated-prison situation, rather than individual personality traits, caused the participants' behavior. Using this situational attribution, the results are compatible with those of the Milgram experiment, where participants complied with orders to administer seemingly dangerous and potentially lethal electric shocks to a shill. Others have posited that the guards assumed leadership roles due to encouragement from researchers rather than conforming to the situation.

Conclusions and observations drawn by the experimenters were largely subjective and anecdotal, and the experiment is practically impossible for other researchers to accurately reproduce. In 1973, Erich Fromm argued, as only a third of the guards displayed sadistic behaviors, SPE is more accurately an example of how a situation cannot influence a person's behavior. He states that there were generalizations in the experiment's results and argued that the personality of an individual does affect behavior when imprisoned. This ran counter to the study's conclusion that the prison situation itself controls the individual's behavior. Fromm also argued that the methods employed to screen participants could not determine the amount of sadism in the subjects.

The experiment has also been used to illustrate cognitive dissonance theory and the power of authority.

Participants' behavior may have been shaped by knowing that they were watched (Hawthorne effect). Instead of being restrained by fear of an observer, guards may have behaved more aggressively when supervisors observing them did not step in to restrain them.

BBC prison study 
Psychologists Alex Haslam and Steve Reicher conducted the BBC Prison Study in 2002 to examine Zimbardo's themes of tyranny and resistance, and published the results in 2006. It was a partial replication of the SPE conducted with the assistance of the BBC, which broadcast a documentary series about the SPE called The Experiment.

As in the SPE, there was a makeshift prison, and all participants were male. Unlike the SPE's invitation to participate, Haslam and Reicher advertised their study as a university-backed social science experiment to be shown on TV. Guards were not instructed on how to behave, only to figure out how to manage a prison. Those selected as prisoners were instructed to daily complete a questionnaire. Both prisoners and guards in this study wore microphones on their shirts, and cameras followed all participants' actions.

Their results and conclusions differed from Zimbardo's and led to a number of publications on tyranny, stress, and leadership. The results were published in leading academic journals such as British Journal of Social Psychology, Journal of Applied Psychology, Social Psychology Quarterly, and Personality and Social Psychology Review. The BBC Prison Study has now been taught as a core study on the UK A-level Psychology OCR syllabus.

While Haslam and Reicher's procedure was not a direct replication of Zimbardo's, their study casts further doubt on the generality of his conclusions. Specifically, it questions the notion that people slip mindlessly into roles. Their research also points to the importance of leadership in the emergence of tyranny of the form displayed by Zimbardo when briefing guards in the Stanford experiment.

Zimbardo initially regarded Haslam and Reicher's study as a reality show as both prisoner and guard knew they were being televised and probably over-acted in their role for the purpose of entertaining watchers of the documentary. He felt that there were definite similarities to reality shows: prisoners had a confessional to describe their feelings, and there were contests for the prisoners. Despite its dissimilarities, Zimbardo believes the results of the BBC study mirrored his own in that the participants were affected by the situation. In 2018, Zimbardo, Reicher, and Haslam issued a joint statement asserting that both experiments were valid. They also agreed that behaviors observed in all participants could have been caused by more than the situation. They urged people to continue research into toxic behaviors, arguing that their studies were unique and need replications to demonstrate reliability and significance.

Legacy 
One positive result of the study is that it has altered the way US prisons are run. For example, juveniles accused of federal crimes are no longer housed before trial with adult prisoners, due to the risk of violence against them.

Zimbardo submitted a statement to the 1971 US House Committee on the Judiciary about the experiment's findings.

Comparisons to Abu Ghraib 
When acts of prisoner torture and abuse at the Abu Ghraib prison in Iraq were publicized in March 2004, Zimbardo was struck by the similarity with his own experiment. He was dismayed by official military and government representatives shifting the blame for the torture and abuses in the Abu Ghraib American military prison onto "a few bad apples", rather than acknowledging the possibly systemic problems of a formally established military incarceration system. Zimbardo was then quoted saying "I argue that we all have the capacity for love and evil--to be Mother Theresa, to be Hitler or Saddam Hussein. It's the situation that brings that out".

Eventually, Zimbardo became involved with the defense team of lawyers representing one of the Abu Ghraib prison guards, Staff Sergeant Ivan "Chip" Frederick. Zimbardo was granted full access to all investigation and background reports, and testified as an expert witness in Frederick's court martial. The trial resulted in an eight-year prison sentence for Frederick in 2004.

Zimbardo drew from his participation in the Frederick case to write the book The Lucifer Effect: Understanding How Good People Turn Evil, which deals with the similarities between his own Stanford prison experiment and the Abu Ghraib abuses.

In popular culture 
Italian filmmaker Carlo Tuzii was the first director to film a story based on the experiment when, in 1977, he directed the television film  ('The cage'), for Rai 1. Tuzii's original story called for a group of twenty young people from various social backgrounds, who were randomly divided into "guards" and "prisoners" and instructed to spend one month on opposite sides of an enormously high gate, with barbed wire on top, built in the middle of a large park. Before principal photography started, however, some concerns from RAI executives forced Tuzii and the screenwiters to alter the script into a very similar story to the actual Stanford experiment, including the outcome. Miguel Bosé starred as lead prisoner Carlo; progressive pop band Pooh scored the film and had a hit in Italy with a 7-inch edit of the theme tune.

The 2001 German-language film Das Experiment starring Moritz Bleibtreu is based on the experiment. It was remade in 2010 in English as The Experiment.

The 2015 film The Stanford Prison Experiment is based on the experiment.

The YouTube series Mind Field, hosted by Michael Stevens, features an episode discussing the experiment.

In Season 3, Episode 2 of the television series Veronica Mars, entitled "My Big Fat Greek Rush Week", a similar experiment is featured. 

In The Overstory by Richard Powers, the fictional character Douglas Pavlicek is a prisoner in the experiment, an experience which shapes later decisions.

In Season 15, Episode 10 of television show American Dad, "American Data", Roger recruits Steve, Toshi, Snot and Barry into a similar experiment.

Ethical concerns 
Some of the guards' behavior allegedly led to dangerous and psychologically damaging situations. Ethical concerns surrounding the experiment often draw comparisons to the Milgram experiment, conducted ten years earlier in 1961 at Yale University, where Stanley Milgram studied obedience to authority. With the treatment that the guards were giving to the prisoners, the guards would become so deeply absorbed into their role as a guard that they would emotionally, physically and mentally humiliate the prisoners:

The experiment was perceived by many to involve questionable ethics, the most serious concern being that it was continued even after participants expressed their desire to withdraw. Despite the fact that participants were told they had the right to leave at any time, the researchers did not allow this. Although there was only limited ethical oversight at the time, some aspects of the study were in contradiction of the contract that was signed with participants.

Since the time of the SPE, ethical guidelines for experiments involving human subjects have become more strict. The Stanford prison experiment led to the implementation of rules to preclude any harmful treatment of participants. Before they are implemented, human studies must now be reviewed by an institutional review board (US) or ethics committee (UK) and found to be in accordance with ethical guidelines set by the American Psychological Association or British Psychological Society. These guidelines involve the consideration of whether the potential benefit to science outweighs the possible risk for physical and psychological harm.

A post-experimental debriefing is now considered an important ethical consideration to ensure that participants are not harmed in any way by their experience in an experiment. Though the researchers did conduct debriefing sessions, they were several years after the SPE. By that time, numerous details were forgotten; nonetheless, Zimbardo has concluded from his follow-up research that participants experienced no lasting negative effects. The American Psychological Association specifies that the debriefing process should occur as soon as possible to assess any psychological harm that may have been done and to rehabilitate participants if necessary. If there is an unavoidable delay in debriefing, the researcher is obligated to take steps to minimize harm.

Similar studies 
In 1967, The Third Wave experiment involved the use of authoritarian dynamics similar to Nazi Party methods of mass control in a classroom setting by high school teacher Ron Jones in Palo Alto, California with the goal of vividly demonstrating to the class how the German public in World War II could have acted in the way it did. Although the veracity of Jones' accounts has been questioned, several participants in the study have gone on record to confirm the events.

In both experiments, participants found it difficult to leave the study due to the roles they were assigned. Both studies examine human nature and the effects of authority. Personalities of the subjects had little influence on both experiments despite the test before the prison experiment.

Both the Milgram and Zimbardo studies clearly show that participants conform to social pressures. Conformity is strengthened by allowing some participants to feel more or less powerful than others. In both experiments, the people's behavior are altered to match the group stereotypes and shows that we conform to others passively, even if the subject at hand is malevolent. It is clear that people's desire to be a good subject is much more prevalent than to be a subject that does good.

A 2007 study on prison-life examined the potential relationship between participant self-selection and the disposition toward aggressive behaviors. They found that when responding to an advertisement, participants "were significantly higher on measures of aggressiveness, authoritarianism, Machiavellianism, narcissism, and social dominance than those who responded to a parallel ad that omitted the words 'of prison life,' and they were significantly lower in dispositional empathy and altruism".

See also 

 Person-situation debate
 Project MKUltra
 Rhythm 0
 Trier social stress test
 Milgram experiment
 Unethical human experimentation in the United States
 Eichmann in Jerusalem: A Report on the Banality of Evil

Footnotes

References 
 
 
 
 
 Musen, K. & Zimbardo, P. G. (1991). Quiet rage: The Stanford prison study. Video recording. Stanford, CA: Psychology Dept., Stanford University.
 
 Zimbardo, P. G. (1971). "The power and pathology of imprisonment",  Congressional Record (Serial No. 15, 1971-10-25). Hearings before Subcommittee No. 3, of the United States House Committee on the Judiciary, Ninety-Second Congress, First Session on Corrections, Part II, Prisons, Prison Reform and Prisoner's Rights: California. Washington, DC: US Government Printing Office.
 Zimbardo, P. G. (2007). "Understanding How Good People Turn Evil." Interview transcript. Democracy Now!, March 30, 2007. Accessed January 17, 2015.

Further reading

External links 
  - vox article detailing how the study is a sham
 Stanford Prison Experiment, a website with info on the experiment and its impact
Interviews with guards, prisoners, and researchers in July/August 2011 Stanford Magazine
 Zimbardo, P. (2007). From Heavens to Hells to Heroes. In-Mind Magazine.
 The official website of the BBC Prison Study
 "The Lie of the Stanford Prison Experiment", The Stanford Daily (April 28, 2005), p. 4  —Criticism by Carlo Prescott, ex-con and consultant/assistant for the experiment
 BBC news article – 40 years on, with video of Philip Zimbardo
 Philip G. Zimbardo Papers (Stanford University Archives)
 Photographs at cbsnews.com

Abu Ghraib and the experiment:
 BBC News: Is it in anyone to abuse a captive?
 BBC News: Why everyone's not a torturer
 Ronald Hilton: US soldiers' bad behavior and Stanford Prison Experiment
 Slate.com: Situationist Ethics: The Stanford Prison Experiment doesn't explain Abu Ghraib, by William Saletan

1971 in California
1971 in science
Academic scandals
August 1971 events in the United States
Conformity
Fictional prisons
Group processes
History of psychology
Human subject research in psychiatry
Human subject research in the United States
Imprisonment and detention
Psychology experiments
Research ethics
Stanford University